Cylindromyiini is a tribe of flies in the family Tachinidae. It contains about 17 genera and 200 species.

Genera
The following 17 genera belong to the tribe Cylindromyiini. Penthosia was formerly in this tribe, but is now a member of Hermyini.

 Argyromima Brauer & Bergenstamm, 1889
 Australotachina Curran, 1834
 Bellina Robineau-Desvoidy, 1863
 Besseria Robineau-Desvoidy, 1830
 Catapariprosopa Townsend, 1927
 Cylindromyia Meigen, 1803
 Hemyda Robineau-Desvoidy, 1830
 Huttonobesseria Curran, 1927
 Lophosia Meigen, 1824
 Mesniletta Herting, 1979
 Neobrachelia Townsend, 1931
 Neolophosia Townsend, 1939
 Phania Meigen, 1824
 Phasiocyptera Townsend, 1927
 Polistiopsis Townsend, 1915
 Polybiocyptera Guimarães, 1979
 Pygidimyia Crosskey, 1967

References

Brachycera tribes
Phasiinae